Branko Mikašinović (1924), was a Yugoslav and Serbian diplomat and politician who held the office of Serbian Minister of Foreign Affairs in the 90s.

References

20th-century Serbian people
Serbian politicians
Foreign ministers of Serbia